Chuck Billy may refer to:

 Chuck Billy (vocalist) (born 1962), American vocalist for the thrash metal band Testament
 Chuck Billy (Chuck Billy 'n' Folks), the main character from Chuck Billy 'n' Folks, best known as related to Monica's Gang